At the 1904 Summer Olympics, seven boxing events were contested, with the sport making its Olympic debut. The competitions were held on Wednesday, September 21, 1904 and on Thursday, September 22, 1904. Contestants in lighter weight classes could also compete in heavier classes. Oliver Kirk, winning the bantamweight and featherweight categories, thus became the only boxer to have won two gold medals in the same Olympics. George Finnegan, Harry Spanjer and Charles Mayer won one gold and one silver medal.

There was also a demonstration bout of women's boxing, which would be added to the Olympic program in 2012.

Medal summary
Note: Jack Egan originally won the silver medal in the lightweight competition and the bronze medal in the welterweight competition. Later, it was discovered that his real name was Frank Joseph Floyd, whereas AAU rules made it illegal to fight under an assumed name. In November 1905, the AAU disqualified Egan from all AAU competitions and ordered him to return all his prizes and medals. Russell van Horn was awarded the silver and Peter Sturholdt awarded the bronze in the lightweight competition, while Joseph Lydon retained bronze in the welterweight competition.

Participating nations
A total of 18 boxers competed at the St. Louis Games:

Medal table

References

 International Olympic Committee medal database

 
1904 Summer Olympics events
1904
1904 in boxing